The 2005 Limerick Senior Hurling Championship was the 111th staging of the Limerick Senior Hurling Championship since its establishment by the Limerick County Board in 1887.

Ahane were the defending champions.

On 16 October 2005, Garryspillane won the championship after a 2-15 to 2-12 defeat of Kilmallock in the final. It remains their only championship title.

References

Limerick Senior Hurling Championship
Limerick Senior Hurling Championship